Sir Wyndham Knatchbull, 12th Baronet JP (9 August 1844 – 30 July 1917) was a British barrister and Conservative Party politician.

Knatchbull was the second son of Sir Norton Knatchbull, 10th Baronet and his wife Mary Watts-Russell, eldest daughter of Jesse Watts-Russell. He was educated at Eton College and worked then as civil servant for the General Post Office. In 1871, he succeeded his older brother Edward as baronet. He entered the British House of Commons in 1875, sitting for East Kent until the following year. Knatchbull was Justice of the Peace for Kent.

Family
Knatchbull married, at Christ church, Folkestone, on 18 March 1902, Margaret Elizabeth Taylor, daughter of Charles Taylor and widow of John Dillon Browne. Their marriage was childless. He died in 1917 aged 73 and was succeeded by Cecil Knatchbull-Hugessen, the second son of his cousin Edward Knatchbull-Hugessen, 1st Baron Brabourne, in turn the second son of Sir Edward Knatchbull, 9th Baronet. His wife survived him for four years until 1921.

References

1844 births
1917 deaths
Baronets in the Baronetage of England
Conservative Party (UK) MPs for English constituencies
People educated at Eton College
UK MPs 1874–1880
English barristers
Wyndham